|
Kurpiewskie  is a village in the administrative district of Gmina Lelis, within Ostrołęka County, Masovian Voivodeship, in east-central Poland.

References

Kurpiewskie